John Southern Spencer (born 10 August 1947) is a former England international rugby union player.

Early life
Spencer was born in Grassington, Yorkshire, in 1947 and educated at Cressbrook, Sedbergh School, and Queens' College, Cambridge.

Playing career 
Spencer played for Cambridge in the Varsity Matches of 1967, 1968 and 1969. He played club rugby for Headingley as a centre and made his England debut at the age of 21 against Ireland at Lansdowne Road, Dublin, in February 1969. He went on to play 14 times for England, scoring 2 tries. His last game was against the President's Overseas XV in a Rugby Football Union centenary match at Twickenham in April 1971. He captained England in four internationals.

Spencer was selected for the 1971 British Lions tour to New Zealand and played in ten matches on the tour. He also represented the Barbarians. In a long Barbarians' career Spencer played 23 games, captained the side on 10 occasions and went on seven consecutive Easter tours to Wales. His 11 tries for the club include a hat-trick against Newport in 1973. He also played against South Africa, Scotland and Fiji in 1970.

Administrative roles 
Spencer was President of the RFU in 2017-18 and President of the Wharfedale R.U.F.C. in Grassington. 

Spencer was the tour manager for the British & Irish Lions on their 2017 tour to New Zealand.

In December 2019 Spencer was named as President of the Barbarians. following his Presidency of the RFU and role as manager of the British & Irish Lions.

Personal life
Spencer is married to Amanda, and has three children, David, Hazel and Emily.

References

1947 births
Living people
English rugby union players
England international rugby union players
British & Irish Lions rugby union players from England
Cambridge University R.U.F.C. players
Barbarian F.C. players
Rugby union centres
Alumni of Queens' College, Cambridge
People educated at Sedbergh School
Wharfedale R.U.F.C. players
Rugby union players from Yorkshire